General elections were held in the Kingdom of Denmark on 22 September 1953, the first under the new constitution. The Social Democratic Party remained the largest in the Folketing, with 74 of the 179 seats. Voter turnout was 81% in Denmark proper and 69% in Greenland. The electoral threshold was 60,000 votes.

Electoral system changes 
This election was held as a result of the passing of the 1953 Danish constitution. The new election law of 1953 increased the size of the Folketing from 151 to 179 members. The number of district seats was increased from 105 to 135, while the number of levelling seats was decreased to 40. This was the first election in which Greenland elected members.

Results

References

Denmark
Denmark
Elections in Denmark
Elections in the Faroe Islands
Elections in Greenland
1953 elections in Denmark
September 1953 events in Europe